The following railroads operate in the U.S. state of South Carolina.

Northern/south

Common freight carriers
Aiken Railway (AIKR)
Camp Hall Rail (CHRL) (Proposed)
Carolina Piedmont Railroad (CPDR)
CSX Transportation (CSXT)
East Cooper and Berkeley Railroad (ECBR)
Greenville and Western Railway (GRLW)
Hampton and Branchville Railroad (HB)
Lancaster and Chester Railway (LC)
Norfolk Southern Railway (NS)
Pee Dee River Railway (PDRR)
Pickens Railway, Honea Path Division (PKHP)
Port Terminal Railroad of South Carolina (PTR)
Port Utilities Commission of Charleston, South Carolina (PUCC)
RJ Corman/Carolina Lines (RJCS)
South Carolina Central Railroad (SCRF)

Passenger carriers
Amtrak (AMTK)

Defunct railroads

Electric
Anderson Traction Company
Augusta–Aiken Railway and Electric Corporation
Charleston Consolidated Railway and Lighting Company
Charleston – Isle of Palms Traction Company
Greenville, Spartanburg and Anderson Railway
Piedmont and Northern Railway (P&N)

Private carriers
Winnsboro Granite Corporation

Notes

References
Association of American Railroads (2003), Railroad Service in South Carolina (PDF). Retrieved May 11, 2005.

South Carolina
 
 
Railroads